Marion Township may refer to:

Arkansas 
 Marion Township, Bradley County, Arkansas
 Marion Township, Drew County, Arkansas
 Marion Township, Lawrence County, Arkansas
 Marion Township, Ouachita County, Arkansas
 Marion Township, Phillips County, Arkansas
 Marion Township, Sebastian County, Arkansas
 Marion Township, White County, Arkansas

Illinois 
 Marion Township, Lee County, Illinois
 Marion Township, Ogle County, Illinois

Indiana 
 Marion Township, Allen County, Indiana
 Marion Township, Boone County, Indiana
 Marion Township, Decatur County, Indiana
 Marion Township, Dubois County, Indiana
 Marion Township, Hendricks County, Indiana
 Marion Township, Jasper County, Indiana
 Marion Township, Jennings County, Indiana
 Marion Township, Lawrence County, Indiana
 Marion Township, Owen County, Indiana
 Marion Township, Pike County, Indiana
 Marion Township, Putnam County, Indiana
 Marion Township, Shelby County, Indiana

Iowa 
 Marion Township, Clayton County, Iowa
 Marion Township, Davis County, Iowa
 Marion Township, Franklin County, Iowa
 Marion Township, Hamilton County, Iowa
 Marion Township, Henry County, Iowa
 Marion Township, Lee County, Iowa
 Marion Township, Linn County, Iowa
 Marion Township, Marshall County, Iowa
 Marion Township, Plymouth County, Iowa
 Marion Township, Washington County, Iowa

Kansas 
 Marion Township, Bourbon County, Kansas
 Marion Township, Doniphan County, Kansas
 Marion Township, Douglas County, Kansas
 Marion Township, Lincoln County, Kansas
 Marion Township, Nemaha County, Kansas

Michigan 
 Marion Township, Charlevoix County, Michigan
 Marion Township, Livingston County, Michigan
 Marion Township, Osceola County, Michigan
 Marion Township, Saginaw County, Michigan
 Marion Township, Sanilac County, Michigan

Minnesota 
 Marion Township, Olmsted County, Minnesota

Missouri 
 Marion Township, Buchanan County, Missouri
 Marion Township, Cole County, Missouri
 Marion Township, Dade County, Missouri
 Marion Township, Daviess County, Missouri
 Marion Township, Grundy County, Missouri
 Marion Township, Jasper County, Missouri
 Marion Township, Harrison County, Missouri
 Marion Township, Mercer County, Missouri
 Marion Township, Monroe County, Missouri
 Marion Township, Newton County, Missouri
 Marion Township, St. Francois County, Missouri

Nebraska 
 Marion Township, Franklin County, Nebraska

New Jersey 
 Marion Township, New Jersey

North Carolina 
 Marion Township, McDowell County, North Carolina

North Dakota 
 Marion Township, Bowman County, North Dakota

Ohio 
 Marion Township, Allen County, Ohio
 Marion Township, Clinton County, Ohio
 Marion Township, Fayette County, Ohio
 Marion Township, Franklin County, Ohio, defunct
 Marion Township, Hancock County, Ohio
 Marion Township, Hardin County, Ohio
 Marion Township, Henry County, Ohio
 Marion Township, Hocking County, Ohio
 Marion Township, Marion County, Ohio
 Marion Township, Mercer County, Ohio
 Marion Township, Morgan County, Ohio
 Marion Township, Noble County, Ohio
 Marion Township, Pike County, Ohio

Pennsylvania 
Marion Township, Beaver County, Pennsylvania
Marion Township, Berks County, Pennsylvania
Marion Township, Butler County, Pennsylvania
Marion Township, Centre County, Pennsylvania

South Dakota 
 Marion Township, Turner County, South Dakota

Township name disambiguation pages